Gnaphosa taurica is a ground spider species found from "Bulgaria to China".

See also 
 List of Gnaphosidae species

References

External links 

Gnaphosidae
Spiders of Asia
Spiders of China
Spiders of Europe
Spiders described in 1875